Rax is a mountain range in the Northern Limestone Alps on the border of the Austrian federal provinces of Lower Austria and Styria.

RAX or Rax may also refer to:

 Gallius Rax, character from the Star Wars: Aftermath trilogy of science fiction novels
 Hello Summer, Goodbye (Rax in the US), a science fiction novel by British author Michael G. Coney
 Radio Aurora Explorer, the first National Science Foundation sponsored CubeSat mission
 RAX, a 64-bit register in the x86 family of instruction set architectures
 IBM Remote Access Computing, called RAX, an obsolete System/360 time-sharing system
 Rax Roast Beef, a regional U.S. fast food restaurant chain
 RAX-2, a CubeSat satellite built as a collaboration between SRI International and students at the University of Michigan
 Retinal homeobox protein Rx, a protein that in humans is encoded by the RAX gene
 Ragnar Axelsson, a photographer